This is an incomplete index of the current and historical principal family seats of English royal, titled and landed gentry families. Some of these seats are no longer occupied by the families with which they are associated, and some are ruinous – e.g. Lowther Castle.

Seats of current members of the British Royal Family

Family seats of English peers

Dukes (other than Royal Dukes)

Marquesses

Earls

Viscounts

Barons

Family seats of English baronets and gentry

See also
List of family seats of Scottish nobility
List of family seats of Irish nobility
List of family seats of Welsh nobility

References

John Bernard Burke, A Genealogical and Heraldic History of the Extinct and Dormant Baronetcies of England (Scott, Webster and Geary, London, 1838)
Bernard Burke, The General Armory of England, Scotland, Ireland, and Wales, Comprising a Registry of Armorial Bearings from the Earliest to the Present Time (Heritage Books, London, 1840)
Charles Mosley (Ed.), Burke’s Peerage, Baronetage and Knightage: Clan Chiefs, Scottish Feudal Barons (107th Edition, Burke's Peerage Ltd, London, 2003)
Burke's Landed Gentry (Burke's Peerage Ltd, London, 1921)
Charles Kidd (Ed.), Debrett's Peerage & Baronetage 2015 (149th Edition, Debrett's Ltd, London, 2014)
Joel Stevens, Symbola heroica: or the mottoes of the nobility and baronets of Great-Britain and Ireland; placed alphabetically (1736)
The daily telegraph,mad about the mansion,a review of hassobury manor (27 February 2005)

Family seats